Valerie Jean Schier was the mayor of the Cairns Regional Council, Queensland, Australia from March 2008 until May 2012.

Schier was born on 22 April 1950 and grew up in Falmouth, a small village on the north east coast of Tasmania. She moved to Cairns in 1982 and bought a house at Machans Beach in 1984. On 15 March 2008, Schier was elected Mayor of the newly amalgamated Cairns Regional Council, a position she maintained until her defeat in May 2012 by Bob Manning.

Personal life 
Schier has one son, James Louis Wilson, who married Kim Le Cras on 9 January 2009.

She has a Bachelor of Arts (1970) and a Diploma of Education (1975) from the University of Tasmania and a Graduate Diploma of Business Management from the University of Central Queensland (1994).

References

External links
 Val Schier's Homepage
 Val Schier on www.CairnsBlog.net

People from Cairns
Living people
Women mayors of places in Queensland
1950 births
Mayors of Cairns